Daniel R. Porterfield (born August 19, 1961) is an American nonprofit executive, academic administrator, and government official serving as the president and CEO of the Aspen Institute. Porterfield previously served as the 15th president of Franklin & Marshall College, senior vice president for strategic development and English professor at Georgetown University, and communications director and chief speechwriter for the U.S. Health and Human Services Secretary during the Clinton Administration.

Early life and education 

A native of Baltimore, Maryland, where he was raised by a single mother, Porterfield graduated from Loyola Blakefield, a Jesuit college prep school, in 1979. In 1983, he received a Bachelor of Arts in English from Georgetown University.

As a student at Georgetown, Porterfield founded the D.C. Schools Project, through which college students tutored immigrant or first-generation children and their parents in English-language skills. He was also instrumental in creating the After School Kids program, which trains college students to tutor at-risk youth in the District of Columbia. Both programs are overseen by the Center for Social Justice Research, Teaching, and Service at Georgetown.

As a Rhodes Scholar, Porterfield earned his Master of Arts from Hertford College, Oxford. He was a Mellon Fellow in the Humanities at The City University of New York Graduate Center, where he earned a PhD in 1995. His dissertation, which covered writers in captivity, received the Irving Howe Prize.

Career

U.S. Department of Health and Human Services 

From 1993 to 1996, Porterfield served as a chief speechwriter and Deputy Assistant Secretary for Public Affairs for the United States Secretary of Health and Human Services.

Georgetown University 

Georgetown University president Leo J. O'Donovan recruited Porterfield to join the English faculty at his alma mater in 1997. He taught literature courses dealing with human rights, education, and social justice. In 2003, Porterfield received Georgetown's Dorothy Brown Award for exemplary commitment to the educational advancement of students. He subsequently received the Georgetown College Edward Bunn, S.J., Award for Faculty Excellence and the School of Foreign Service Faculty Excellence Award. In 2004 he was initiated into the Georgetown chapter of Omicron Delta Kappa.

Porterfield later served as senior vice president for strategic development at Georgetown. In this role he assisted President John J. DeGioia with the development of new projects and led Georgetown's institutional positioning, communications, government relations, community relations, and intercollegiate athletics. He spearheaded Georgetown's relationship with Teach For America, the KIPP Foundation, the D.C. public schools, and the Cristo Rey Network. He also served as interim director of Georgetown's NCAA Division I athletics program from June 2009 to April 2010.

Franklin & Marshall College 

On Nov. 16, 2010, the Franklin & Marshall College board of trustees announced its selection of Porterfield to serve as the college's 15th president. Porterfield began his tenure at F&M on March 1, 2011 and was inaugurated on Sept. 25, 2011.

In his inaugural address, titled "Kindle Fire," Porterfield spoke about the core purposes and values of a liberal arts education, the traditions of Franklin & Marshall and the power of ideas and knowledge. "It is imperative that we at F&M and all liberal arts colleges embrace the idea that we can be high-impact forces for the long-term good in the world," Porterfield said. "Liberal arts education is the single finest form of cultivating emerging human talent and character that this world has ever known."

Porterfield's strategies led F&M to enroll some of the most talented and diverse classes in its history. The percentage of incoming Pell Grant-eligible students and domestic students of color tripled during his tenure. Porterfield and F&M attributed these results to a doubling of need-based financial aid for the first-year class over that time period and to a strategy of targeted outreach to promising students in underserved communities.

As he did at Georgetown, Porterfield forged new partnerships between F&M and K-12 educators and access programs including the Posse Foundation, the KIPP Foundation, Achievement First, Uncommon Schools, Noble, College Match, College Track, the College Advising Corps and Cristo Rey Network. While serving at F&M, he joined the board of the College Board and chaired the board of the Lenfest Scholars Foundation, a Philadelphia-based scholarship and college access organization. He also sat on the Teach For America University Champions' Board and the College Advising Corps Advisory Board.

In 2011, Porterfield created a highly regarded pre-college summer program, F&M College Prep, to allow more than 70 rising seniors from low-income communities to spend three weeks learning from F&M faculty and current students. He also absorbed F&M's career center into a comprehensive Office of Student & Post-Graduate Development, an effort that gained national attention for its innovative approach to transitioning students into successful lives after college. Under Porterfield's leadership, F&M also set records for applications, fundraising, and fellowships; developed cutting edge new centers for student wellness and faculty excellence; constructed a new athletics stadium; and embarked upon the process of building a groundbreaking new visual arts center designed by world-renowned architect Steven Holl.

The KIPP Foundation honored Porterfield in 2012 with its “Beyond Z” award, which “celebrates members of the school community who go above and beyond for the benefit of children,” and the “I Have A Dream” Foundation presented him with its Eugene M. Lang Lifetime Achievement Award in 2014. In 2016, Porterfield was named a Champion of Change for College Opportunity by the White House.

In 2013, Porterfield took part as a panelist discussing “A Path to Higher Ed” on NBC News’ Education Nation, and was the only liberal arts college president invited to speak at the three White House summits focusing on college opportunity hosted by the Obama administration in 2014.

Porterfield and F&M received national recognition and visibility for their work to expand educational opportunity, including high-profile coverage in The Washington Post, The New York Times, The Philadelphia Inquirer, and The Chronicle of Higher Education, and on the PBS NewsHour. They also led the creation of the American Talent Initiative (ATI), an alliance of top colleges and universities funded by Bloomberg Philanthropies and staffed by the Aspen Institute and the research organization Ithaka S+R with a national goal of enrolling 50,000 more high-achieving low-income students in leading institutions by 2025.

In 2019, F&M faced deep budget cuts attributed to tuition discounting practices instituted during Porterfield's presidency.

Aspen Institute 

The Aspen Institute named Porterfield to succeed author and journalist Walter Isaacson as its next president and CEO on November 30, 2017. He assumed the position on June 1, 2018.

In one of his early public appearances as President and CEO, Porterfield described the Aspen Institute as “a force for good in communities near and far; convening thinkers and leaders; bringing into contact the very best ideas; framing and helping to solve the great difficulties of the day; confronting challenges from which others turn away; investing in leaders of every type; and always ensuring that questions of ethics and values and meaning have a prominent place in our conversations and our society.”

Under Porterfield, the Institute has launched new initiatives focused on criminal justice reform, science and society, economic inclusion, grassroots and community leadership, and more. In the Roaring Fork Valley of Colorado, where the Institute was founded and where it maintains its Aspen Meadows campus, it has broadened its partnerships with the local community and deepened its connection with its aesthetic and cultural heritage through the creation of a $20 million educational facility and creativity corridor celebrating the works of Bauhaus master Herbert Bayer, one of the founders of the Institute.

In 2019, the Institute created the Aspen Partnership for an Inclusive Economy (APIE) with a founding partner, the Mastercard Center for Inclusive Growth, and a $26 million multi-year commitment from Mastercard. Through APIE, the Institute brings together its networks and programs with a diverse range of public, private, and nonprofit leaders to help reconstruct the global economy so that it drives greater security, opportunity, and resilience for all.

Porterfield serves on the national board of directors of Teach For America and on the board of the Education Trust, and is a former trustee of the College Board. He was elected to the American Academy of Arts and Sciences in 2020 and has been awarded honorary degrees from Wake Forest University, Miami Dade College, Elizabethtown College, and Mt. Aloysius College.

Personal 

Porterfield is married to Karen A. Herrling, an attorney. They have three children.

References

1961 births
Living people
Alumni of Hertford College, Oxford
Presidents of Franklin & Marshall College
Georgetown Hoyas athletic directors
Georgetown College (Georgetown University) alumni
Graduate Center, CUNY alumni
People from Baltimore